This is a list of people who have been knighted by the British honours system for their contribution to sport.

Administration
Dame Marea Hartman (1994, DBE, 1920–1994)*British athletics sports administrator. She was one of the longest-serving and most influential sports administrators in 20th century British athletics.

Athletics
Sir Roger Bannister (1975, Knight Bachelor, 1929–2018)
Sir Murray Halberg (1988, Knight Bachelor, 1933–2022)
Sir Christopher Chataway (1995, Knight Bachelor, 1931–2014)
Dame Mary Peters (2000, DBE, born 1939) *Note: Peters was appointed a Lady Companion of the Order of the Garter in 2019, becoming Lady Mary Peters.
Sir Peter Snell (2002, redesignated KNZM from DCNZM 2009, 1938–2019)
Dame Kelly Holmes (2005, DBE, born 1970)
Dame Tanni Grey-Thompson, Baroness Grey-Thompson (2005, DBE, born 1969)
Sebastian Coe, Baron Coe (2006, KBE, born 1956) *Note: Coe had been made a Life peer in 2000.
Sir John Walker (2009, KNZM, born 1952)
Sir Mo Farah (2017, Knight Bachelor, born 1983)
Dame Jessica Ennis-Hill (2017, DBE, born 1986)
Dame Valerie Adams (2017, DNZM, born 1984)
Dame Yvette Corlett Williams (2019, DNZM, 1929–2019) *Note: Yvette Corlett Williams accepted the honour and it was made effective before she died. It was not appointed posthumously despite her death before formal investiture. (Unlike certain other honours, knighthoods and damehoods cannot be appointed posthumously.)
Sir Brendan Foster (2020, Knight Bachelor, born 1948)
Dame Denise Lewis (2023, DBE, born 1972)

Badminton
Sir Craig Reedie (2006, Knight Bachelor, born 1941)

Boxing
Sir Henry Cooper (2000, Knight Bachelor, 1934–2011)

Cricket
See List of cricketers who were knighted (30)

Cycling/Racing
Sir Hubert Opperman (1968, Knight Bachelor, 1904–1996) *Note: Opperman was perhaps best known for his cycling achievements, but his 1968 knighthood as a Knight Bachelor was in recognition of his service as Australian High Commissioner to Malta.
Sir Chris Hoy (2009, Knight Bachelor, born 1976)
Dame Sarah Storey (2013, DBE, born 1977)
Sir Bradley Wiggins (2013, Knight Bachelor, born 1980)
Sir Jason Kenny (2022, Knight Bachelor, born 1988)
Dame Laura Kenny (2022, DBE, born 1992)

Equestrian
Sir Harry Llewellyn (1997, Knight Bachelor (1911–1999)
Sir Mark Todd (2013, KNZM, born 1956)
Sir Lee Pearson (2017, Knight Bachelor, born 1974)

Fencing
Dame Mary Glen-Haig (1993, DBE, 1918–2014)

Football
See List of football personalities with British honours (15 knighthoods)

Golf
Sir Henry Cotton (1988, Knight Bachelor, 1907–1987) *Note: Cotton had accepted the knighthood and it was made effective before his death. It was not appointed posthumously despite his death before his formal investiture. (Unlike certain other honours, knighthoods and damehoods cannot be appointed posthumously.)
Sir Bob Charles (1999, KNZM, born 1936)
Sir Nick Faldo (2009, Knight Bachelor, born 1957)
Dame Laura Davies (2014, DBE, born 1963)

Horse racing
Sir Gordon Richards (1953, Knight Bachelor, 1904–1986)
Sir Jack Jarvis (1967, Knight Bachelor, 1887–1968)
Sir Cecil Boyd-Rochfort (1968, KCVO, 1887–1983)
Sir Noel Murless (1977, Knight Bachelor, 1910–1987)
Sir Peter O'Sullevan (1997, Knight Bachelor, 1918–2015)
Sir Michael Stoute (1997, Knight Bachelor (born 1945)
Sir Henry Cecil (2011, Knight Bachelor, 1943–2013)
Sir Tony McCoy (2016, Knight Bachelor, born 1974)

Motor racing
Sir Henry Segrave (1929, Knight Bachelor, 1896–1930)
Sir Malcolm Campbell (1931, Knight Bachelor, 1885–1948)
Sir Jack Brabham (1978, Knight Bachelor, 1926–2014)
Sir Frank Williams (1999, Knight Bachelor, 1942–2021)
Sir Stirling Moss (2000, Knight Bachelor, 1929–2020)
Sir Jackie Stewart (2001, Knight Bachelor, born 1939)
Sir Patrick Head (2015, Knight Bachelor, born 1946)
Sir Lewis Hamilton (2021, Knight Bachelor, born 1985)

Mountaineering
Sir Edmund Hillary (1953, KBE, 1919–2008) *Note: Hillary was appointed a Knight Companion of the Order of the Garter in 1995.
Sir John Hunt (1953, Knight Bachelor, 1910–1988)
Sir Chris Bonington (1996, Knight Bachelor, born 1934)
Sir Graeme Dingle (2017, KNZM born 1945)

Netball
Dame Lois Muir (2004, redesignated DNZM from DCNZM 2009, born 1935)
Dame Noeline Taurua (2020, DNZM, born 1968)

Rowing
Sir Steve Redgrave (2001, Knight Bachelor, born 1962)
Sir Matthew Pinsent (2005, Knight Bachelor, born 1970)
Sir Don Rowlands (2015, KNZM, 1926–2015)
Dame Katherine Grainger (2017, DBE, born 1975)

Rugby
Sir Wilson Whineray (1998, KNZM, 1935–2012)
Sir Brian Lochore (1999, KNZM, 1940–2019)
Sir Colin Meads (2001, redesignated KNZM from DCNZM 2009, 1936–2017)
Sir Clive Woodward (2004, Knight Bachelor, born 1956)
Sir Ian McGeechan (2010, Knight Bachelor, born 1946)
Sir Fred Allen (2010, KNZM, 1920–2012)
Sir John Graham (2011, KNZM, 1935–2017)
Sir Graham Henry (2012, KNZM, born 1946)
Sir John Kirwan (2012, KNZM, born 1964)
Sir Gordon Tietjens (2013, KNZM, born 1955)
Sir Gareth Edwards (2015, Knight Bachelor, born 1947)
Sir Michael Jones (2017, KNZM, born 1965) *Note: Although known as a rugby union player, Jones was knighted for services to the Pacific community and youth.
Sir Bryan Williams (2018, KNZM, born 1950)
Sir Bill Beaumont (2019, Knight Bachelor, born 1952)
Sir Graham Lowe (2019, KNZM, born 1946) *Note: Although known as a rugby league coach, Lowe was knighted for services to youth and education, primarily through his work in the Lowie Foundation.
Sir Steve Hansen (2020, KNZM, born 1959)
Sir Wayne Shelford (2021, KNZM, born 1957)

Sheep Shearing
Sir David Fagan (2016, KNZM, born 1961)

Squash
Dame Susan Devoy (1998, DNZM, born 1964)

Tennis
Sir Herbert Wilberforce (1931, Knight Bachelor, 1864-1941)*Wilberforce was vice-president of the All England Lawn Tennis and Croquet Club from 1911 to 1921, and president from 1921 to 1936. 
Sir Norman Brookes (1939, Knight Bachelor, 1877–1968)
Sir Andy Murray (2017, Knight Bachelor, born 1987)
Dame Ruia Morrison (2021, DNZM, born 1936)

Triathlon
Dame Flora Duffy (2022, DBE, born 1987)

Yachting
Sir Francis Chichester (1967, KBE, 1901–1972)
Sir Alec Rose (1968, Knight Bachelor, 1908–1991)
Dame Naomi James (1979, DBE, born 1949)
Sir James Hardy (1981, Knight Bachelor (born 1932)
Sir Peter Blake (1995, KBE, 1948–2001) 
Sir Robin Knox-Johnston (1995, Knight Bachelor, born 1939)
Sir Durward Knowles (1996, Knight Bachelor (1917-2018)
Sir Chay Blyth (1997, Knight Bachelor, born 1940)
Sir Russell Coutts (2000, redesignated KNZM from DCNZM 2009, born 1962)
Dame Ellen MacArthur (2005, DBE, born 1976)
Sir Ben Ainslie (2013, Knight Bachelor, born 1977)
Sir Godfrey Kelly (2020, KCMG, 1928–2022)

Wheelchair Basketball
Sir Philip Craven (2005, Knight Bachelor, born 1950)

See also
Orders of precedence in the United Kingdom
List of honorary British knights and dames
Post-nominal letters

References

British honours system
 
 
Knights and dames